Oittaa is a district in Espoo, Finland, located on the southern shore of Lake Bodom. There is a popular camping area and a public beach in Oittaa.

Districts of Espoo